Folkes or ffolkes is a surname, and may refer to:

 Folkes Brothers, Jamaican mento group
 Cheston Folkes, American politician
 Martin Folkes
 Michael ffolkes
 Steve Folkes
 Warren Davis Folkes, American politician
Sir Martin ffolkes, 1st Baronet
 Sir William ffolkes, 2nd Baronet
 Sir William ffolkes, 3rd Baronet
Folkes (foundry), foundry from the United Kingdom established in 1697

Fictional people 
 Brigadier General Alistair Ffolkes, a character in the first season episode "No Need to Know" of the 1980 American crime drama television series Magnum PI
 Rufus Excalibur ffolkes, character played by Roger Moore in the 1980 British action film North Sea Hijack

See also
 ‹ff›, a Latin alphabet digraph, see List of digraphs in Latin alphabets#F
 ffolkes baronets
 North Sea Hijack, a 1980 British action film starring Roger Moore released in the US as "ffolkes".
 Fowkes (disambiguation)